The Marais des Cygnes massacre is considered the last significant act of violence in Bleeding Kansas prior to the outbreak of the American Civil War. On May 19, 1858, approximately 30 men led by Charles Hamilton, a Georgia native and proslavery leader, crossed into the Kansas Territory from Missouri. They arrived at Trading Post, Kansas, in the morning and then headed back to Missouri. Along the way, they captured 11 Free-Staters, none of whom were armed and, it is said, none of whom had participated in the ongoing violence. Most of the men knew Hamilton and apparently did not realize he meant them harm. These prisoners were led into a defile, where Hamilton ordered his men to shoot, firing the first and last bullet himself. Five men were killed and five severely wounded. Only one Free-Stater escaped injury.

Hamilton and his gang returned to Missouri. Only one man was ever prosecuted for the crime. William Griffith of Bates County, Missouri, was arrested in the spring of 1863 and was kept until October 30th of that year. Charles Hamilton returned to Georgia, where he died in 1880.

The incident horrified the U.S. and inspired John Greenleaf Whittier to write a poem on the murders, "Le Marais du Cygne", which appeared in the September 1858 The Atlantic Monthly.

See also

 Great Hanging at Gainesville
 Marais des Cygnes Massacre Site, a U.S. National Historic Landmark
 List of battles fought in Kansas
 List of incidents of civil unrest in the United States

References

External links
Kansas State Historical Society: Marais Massacre  

1858 riots
1858 in the United States
Massacres in 1858
Bleeding Kansas
Massacres in the United States
Deaths by firearm in Kansas
Crimes in Kansas
1858 in Kansas Territory
May 1858 events
American anti-abolitionist riots and civil disorder